= Charles Lettal =

Luxembourgish footballer

Personal information
- Date of birth: 21 March 1935 (age 91)

International career
Years	Team	Apps	(Gls)
1955–1959	Luxembourg	12	(4)

Charles Lettal (born 21 March 1935) is a Luxembourgish footballer. He played in twelve matches for the Luxembourg national football team from 1955 to 1959.
